Yamaha Champions Riding School is a motorcycle training program based primarily at New Jersey Motorsports Park in Millville, New Jersey, but operating at race tracks all over the Continental United States. It is the evolution of the now-defunct Freddie Spencer High Performance Riding School and spent its first four years at Miller Motorsports Park.  Yamaha Champions Riding School is often referred to as "YCRS" or "ChampSchool." Yamaha Champions Riding School teaches competition-proven techniques of motorcycle control to any pavement-bound rider with the ultimate goal of promoting safer riding in any condition. The school uses race tracks to teach riders because it is a controlled environment, features repeatable corners, and lends itself toward measurable improvement.

Joshua Siegel, investor and CCS club racer, financially sponsors and majority owns Yamaha Champions Riding School with minority ownership from YCRS’s executive leadership Nick Lenatsch, Chris Peris, Limore Shur, and Keith Culver.

Philosophy 
Yamaha Champions Riding School derives its a curriculum from a single question: “What are the best riders in the world doing to survive and thrive on two wheels?” The underlying theory behind the curriculum is that the motorcycle does not know whether it is on a country road, parking lot, city street, or race track, but works best when riders apply the same habits, techniques, and inputs that the expert riders who designed the bike use. Yamaha Champions Riding School uses the term "Champions Habits" to describe these techniques. The school caters to "any rider, on any bike, street or track" and does not utilize a levels-based system, preferring instead to promote a "brilliance in the basics" approach that applies to any rider, with the difference between a street-only rider and a professional racer being the degree of application.

Staff 
The program is led by Nick Ienatsch and former WSBK rider/current WERA Endurance National Champion Chris Peris. MotoAmerica Superbike racer and 2021 MotoAmerica King of the Baggers, Kyle Wyman and his brother, MotoAmerica racer Cody Wyman are senior instructors at the school. Former AMA racer Ken Hill has also been associated with the school and guest-instructs.

The school often has guest instructors such as Yamaha-sponsored MotoGP, World Superbike and AMA racers. Names like Bradley Smith Colin Edwards, James Toseland, Josh Hayes, Roger Lee Hayden and Ben Spies have all taught at the school.

World Superbike and AMA Superbike Champion Scott Russell has also been a frequent guest instructor, and the school's 2016 instructor line-up included MotoAmerica champions J. D. Beach, Cameron Beaubier, and Garrett Gerloff.

The school's close partnership with Yamaha-US puts students on various Yamaha motorcycles and also exposes them to Yamaha teams who occasionally test during the schools. These tests allow students to get a first-hand glimpse at the machinery and processes of the best roadracing teams in the United States.

Programs 
Yamaha Champions Riding School offers three programs, and while the school is sponsored by Yamaha - and Yamaha motorcycles are available for rent for the two-day ChampSchool - any make and model of motorcycle are welcome:

ChampSchool is the halo program for Yamaha Champions Riding School. ChampSchool - the only MSF Tier-3 school - is a two-day immersive motorcycle riding curriculum designed for current riders of any skill level. With a 4:1 student-to-instructor ratio, the program offers individualized, tailored feedback throughout the two days a student is at the school.

The first day begins with demonstrations and discussions of braking, body position, traction/grip, control manipulation before oscillating between the track and classroom for the majority of the day.  While instructor-driven van laps demonstrate and explain a few techniques, much of the day is spent on the race track, putting the classroom lessons to work. Day one topics covered include how speed relates to radius, braking and cornering technique, and the mental approaches of the best riders in the world. Day two dials up the intensity both in the classroom and on track, featuring topics such as ergonomics, suspension geometry, rear brake application, and visual techniques. Students are filmed both days and the film is reviewed in-class at the end of each day, during a fully-catered dinner. Students are offered two-up rides on day two, as well as the opportunity to ride a number of new Yamaha motorcycles and conduct mini-drills at the end of the day.

ChampStreet is a one-day program designed specifically for street riders, in street gear, on street bikes. The curriculum is derived from the two-day ChampSchool program, but scaled down to an affordable price point. While the ChampStreet course is often taught in conjunction with the two-day ChampSchool at race tracks, ChampStreet does not require race leathers, and race-prepped motorcycles are prohibited from attending. The curriculum is tailored specifically for street riding, and covers topics such as street survival strategies in addition to motorcycle control skills. Unlike most street-based courses, ChampStreet happens at highway speeds on race tracks and/or massive parking lots instead of traditional tight cone drills at 20 mph. ChampStreet covers topics like trailbraking, grip/traction, visual techniques, mid-corner stops, and more.

ChampGrad is a single-day program, designed for graduates of the two-day ChampSchool to return and focus on refining specific skills with a 2:1 student-to-instructor ratio, data analysis, extra film laps, two-up rides, drills, and more time spent on the motorcycles.

Champ U 
In August 2021, Yamaha Champions Riding School expanded their program selection with an inexpensive, online version of the two-day ChampSchool class. "Champ U: The Core Curriculum" is an online-only school, featuring 40 videos and quizzes, 30 drills, forum access for direct communication with instructors and other students, and is available anywhere with sufficient internet access.
With the increase in in-person events, the school has announced a partial schedule for the 2023 season. The school has announced events that will take place in Arizona, California, Colorado, Florida Illinois, New Jersey, North Carolina, Pennsylvania, Texas, and Washington state. There will be more than 30 events in the 2023 season. The school will also host two day ChampSchool, ChampStreet, ChampGrad, and Racer Only curriculums for its students.

Partnerships 
Yamaha Champions Riding School has partnerships or close ties to the following organizations:

United States Motorcycle Coaching Association

N2 Trackdays

TrackDaz

TrackTime

Xcel

Utah Sport Bike Association

References

Further reading

External links 

Millville, New Jersey
Motorcycle training
Year of establishment missing